Meridian 1, also known as Meridian No.11L, was a Russian communications satellite. It was the first satellite to be launched as part of the Meridian system to replace the older Molniya series.

Meridian 1 was the first Russian Government satellite to be launched by a Soyuz-2 rocket. The Soyuz-2.1a configuration was used, along with a Fregat upper stage. The launch occurred from Site 43/4 at the Plesetsk Cosmodrome at 08:34:44 GMT on 24 December 2006.

It was constructed by ISS Reshetnev (at the time known as NPO-PM) and was believed to be based on the Uragan-M satellite bus, which has also been used for GLONASS navigation satellites.

The satellite entered service on 1 February 2007. By May 2009 it had failed, before the end of its projected lifespan. NPO-PM reported that an impact with a piece of debris had caused the spacecraft to malfunction.

Meridian 1 re-entered on 6 July 2021, around 12:20 UTC.

References

Spacecraft launched in 2006
Spacecraft launched by Soyuz-2 rockets
Meridian satellites
2006 in Russia